Shen Jingdong (born 1965) is a contemporary Chinese artist known for his paintings and sculptures of Chinese iconography. He currently lives in Beijing.

Life and career 
Shen Jingdong was born in 1965 in Nanjing (province of Jiangsu), China. Shen graduated from the Nanjing Xiaozhuang Normal School in 1984 and the Nanjing Arts Institute in 1991.
After studying Fine art, Shen was conscripted to the Military Drama Troupe of Nanjing Military Area, where he worked for 16 years until 2007.

In the 2000s, the emergence of Shen JingDong in a period of revival for Chinese Contemporary Art suggested a dawning of a new era. Previously, ideological criticism determined the direction of new contemporary art. Shen JingDong provides a definitive example of commercialized aesthetics in Chinese pop art. He attempted various conceptual and performing arts in the 1990s, influenced by Dadaism and pop art.

In 2006, ‘Hero No.12‘ was collected in the National Art Museum of China. 

Since 2007, his works have been exhibited in Hong Kong, Italy, the Republic of Korea, Japan, France, New York and other areas of the United States.

In 2008, his Chinese and international artistic career evolved quickly; Shen become an important contemporary artist of the new wave with his Hero series.  He created into different kinds of people the image of the soldier and of the icons of Chinese life as represented in new forms, sometimes diverted in expressive colors (Blue, Green, Red or Yellow).

In this work, he reveals his innermost thoughts, hidden in metaphors, humor and smiles. Amid the urbanisation and globalization occurring throughout China, Shen JingDong can be seen in his works as a witness to the changes globalisation brings. Amid the strengthening of ideology and oppression of freedom that coincides with globalisation, his work provides a new way out. Through the harmony of the realm of both imagination and reality, he builds his own fairy tales.
 His painting The Bugle realized in 2012 illustrates perfectly his work, allowing each observer to have a new look on the contemporary art, but also a reflection and interpretation intellectual, sensitive and emotional.
The artworks of Shen can be seen in private and public collections worldwide. One of the most famous collectors of Shen's works is actress Zhang Ziyi.

The artist’s market success was displayed already on his home soil in 2013 when his painting Three Great Men, sold at Beijing Googut & Auction for £154,000  – Shen’s auction record price to date. Furthermore, at the international auction house Sotheby’s in 2018 his painting Strength sold for over £79,000 after generating competitive bidding from an eclectic range of clients.

Exhibitions

Selected exhibitions 
Exhibitions include:

2021

 Blooming flowers and full moon, Beiqiu Art Museum, Nanjing
 Best Role, Solo Exhibition, Diyuan Art Museum, Jiaxing

2020

 Shen Jingdong : The Beautiful Fairy Tales, Asia House, London, UK 
 Small eyes-big world, XSPACE Gallery, Nanjing, China

2019

 Art.Design and Home, Red Star Macalline, Guiyang, China
 Shen Jingdong came here, Hôtel de l'industrie, Paris, France
 Shen Jingdong is here, Chinese gallery, New York, USA
 Shen Jingdong was here, Il Giardino Bianco Art Space, Venice, Italy

2018

 From South to North in 2018—Shen Jingdong's Invitational Exhibition of Individual Works, Art Museum of School of Fine Arts and Design of Shenyang Normal University, China
 Start from Nanjing, Jinling Art Museum, Nanjing, China.
 Guns N’Roses—Shen Jingdong’s Solo Exhibition, Parkview Green ART, Beijing, China

2017

 International Joke: Shen Jingdong, Ross Art Museum, Maryland, USA
 Art Career Record of Good Soldier Jingdong: Shen Jingdong Literature Exhibition, Songzhuang Contemporary Art Documentary Exhibition, Beijing China
 Shen Jingdong Story:Shenjingdong, Art and Design Academy Art Museum, Yanshan University, Qinhuangdao, China

2016

 International Joke: Shen Jingdong Solo Exhibition, Korean Craft Museum, Cheongju, Republic of Korea
 Shen Jingdong +Jon Tsoi:No head No heart, WhiteBox, New York, USA
 Let’s Paint Together: Shen Jingdong and Liao Mingming Collaborative Exhibition, Yue Museum of Art, Beijing, China
 New Representational Art in China, Hudson Center for Contemporary Arts, Poughkeepsie, USA

2015

 The Little Prince, E Space, Hong Kong
 Dawn of a New Age: Ink Redefined, Art Futures Gallery, Hong Kong
 Censure, Galerie Dock Sud, Sète, France

2014

 My Kingdom of Fairytales, Art Futures Group, ArtOne, Hong Kong
 Hidden Meanings, Colour Explosion, Today Art Museum, Beijing, China
 Art Paris - Art Fair, "France-Chine 50" (la Chine à l'honneur), France 

2013

 Art Basel - Miami Beach, Exhibition Miami FL, États-Unis 
 Art Basel - Hong Kong, Exhibition China 
 New Art Fair, Espace Pierre Cardin, Paris, France 

2012
 ST-ART, Foire Internationale d'art contemporain, Strasbourg, France 

2011

 Continue with Revolution, 3V Gallery, Nanjing, China
 East/west: Visually Speaking, Frost Art Museum, Miami, FL, United States

2010
 Chasing Flames - Chinese Group Show - Zadok Art Gallery, Miami, FL
 Lille Art Fair, Foire internationale d'art contemporain, Lille, France 
 State of the Dao: Chinese Contemporary Art - Lehman College Art Gallery, New York City, NY
 “RESHAPING HISTORY Chinart from 2000 to 2009″ China National Convention Center Beijing, China                                                                      

2009
 Hero, Volta Art Fair, New York, USA, (solo)
 Tension at Poles – Invitational Exhibition of Works of Masters from Beijing, Shanghai and Chengdu, Luodai Town, Chengdu, China
 Trust – Exhibition of Contemporary Painting, Star Factory Art Center, Beijing, China
 Context – Invitational Exhibition of Contemporary Painting, Beijing Foundery Museum of Art, China
 Memory of China – Exchange Exhibition of Chinese and Spanish Artists’ Works, Time Space in 798 Factory, Beijing, China
 Strength of Practice, the Third Documenta of Contemporary Chinese Prints, Nanjing Museum, China
 Red Memory, Liu Haisu Art Museum, Shanghai, China
 China-Korean Exchange Exposition, 798 Yan Gallery, Beijing, China
 Invitational Exhibition of Experimental Contemporary Arts, Museum of Contemporary Art, Songzhuang, Beijing, China
 Chengdu Biennale, New International Convention & Exposition Center, Chengdu, China
 Visual Presentation of Identity, Shanghai Duolun Museum of Modern Art, Shanghai, China

2008
 Heroes - ChinaSquare, New York (solo)
 The Most Beloved People, Today Art Museum & New Millennium Gallery, Beijing, China (solo)
 Multiple Perspectives – Exhibition of 11 Chinese Contemporary Artists’ Works, Beijing You Gallery, Beijing, China
 Assembling under the Five Rings, Legend Hotel, Beijing, China
 Up North – Exhibition of Jiangsu Artists’ Works, Egret Art Center, Beijing, China
 Up North, Down South, Art for All Society, Beijing, China
 Post-Modern Expression of Red Classics, Dong. Coffee. Event in 798 Art Zone, Beijing, China
 Strength of Practice – the Second Documenta of Contemporary Chinese Prints, Nanjing Museum, China
 Drifting – China – Korean Exchange Exposition, Top Gallery, 798 Art Zone, Beijing, China

2007
 Making Heroes for ten years, Beijing Imagine Gallery, China (solo)
 We Could Be Heroes – Shen Jingdong solo exhibition, Hong Kong Yan Gallery (solo)
 Progressive Action, Beijing Millennium Time Gallery, China
 Body ? Impression – The Human Body in Contemporary Chinese Art, Red Gate Gallery, 798 Art Zone, Beijing, China
 Revolution, China Square Gallery, New York, USA
 Tie – Path, You Gallery, Beijing, China
 The Fourth China International Art Gallery expo, Beijing National Trade Center, China

2006

 Images of Heroes, New Millennium Gallery, Beijing, China
 Exhibition of One Painting, 88 Art Document Storehouse, Beijing, China

Public collections 
The following public collections include Shen's work:

 2019 – Hello, Van Gogh, acrylic on canvas, 80 × 60 cm. French Industrial Palace, Paris, France
 2018 – The Little Prince, oil on canvas, 100x100cm. Jinling Art Museum, China
 2014 – Salute, Stainless Steel, 200 cm high. Bengbu University, China
 2013 – Salute, Stainless steel, 200 cm high. Xiamen Jimei University, China
 2013 – Soldier with a Gun, Cast bronze, 200 cm high. Xiamen Jimei University, China
 2012 – Salute, Cast bronze, 170 cm tall. Nanjing Art Institute, China
 2009 – Hero, oil on canvas, 100 cm × 100 cm. WURTH Art Museum, Spain
 2008 – Harmony One, oil on canvas, 200 cm × 600 cm. Oberte Museum, Germany
 2008 – Head of a Soldier, spray paint in glass-steel, 56 cm × 52 cm × 35 cm, Henan Art Museum, China
 2007 – Heroes Series No.12, oil on canvas, 200 cm × 200 cm, National Art Museum of China, China
 2007 – Heroes Series No.42, oil on canvas, 200 cm × 200 cm, Singapore Museum of Fine Arts, Singapore
 2006 – Founding Ceremony, oil on canvas, 200 cm × 700 cm. Shanghai Art Museum No. 1, China

See also 
Zhang Ziyi
Yue Minjun
Zhang Xiaogang

References

External links 
Shen Jingdong’s website
Connect with Shen Jingdong
Shen Jingdong - Artnet
Coral Contemporary - Shen Jingdong’s gallery
Yang Gallery - Beijing & Singapore
China Square Gallery - New York
Dock Sud Gallery - France

Chinese contemporary artists
Artists from Nanjing
1965 births
21st-century Chinese painters
Living people